Alesia Raut is a Russian model, VJ, and a fashion choreographer. She had anchored a travel show on STAR One. She was a contestant in a TV reality show Fear Factor: Khatron Ke Khiladi (season 4). Alesia had also featured in some item songs such as "Meri Beri Ber" and "Ek Aankh Maro". She is the official ramp-walk trainer of Femina Miss India and Miss India Universe pageants.

Personal life 

Alesia was born in Moscow, Russia to an Indian father and a Russian mother. She attended Bombay Cambridge Gurukul (Andheri E) and graduated in commerce from Mithibai College in Juhu. She has a sister, Anjali Raut who is a former model in Mumbai and a brother, Amit Raut. Alesia married Alexander Yanovskiy, a Russian Economist. She moved to Moscow but the marriage failed and she returned to India with her son. Alesia married television actor Siddhanth Suryavanshi in November 2017.

Modeling career 

Alesia had never imagined making it into modeling. However a neighbour took some pictures and sent them to the look of year contest 1999, organized by Times Group in India. She became a finalist in the "Look of the year-1999" Contest. After the failure of her marriage, she returned to Mumbai from Moscow, Russia along with her son Mark. Her sister Anjali, who was a well-established model, got her back into contact with some fashion choreographers including Lubna Adams, Noyonika Chatterjee and Marc Robinson. She then restarted her modeling career. She was soon busy, including modeling for the prestigious Wills Lifestyle India Fashion Week shows and International Institute of Fashion Design shows. She had done runway in many shows such as Manish Malhotra. And she also played the role of a model in Madhur Bhandarkar's movie Fashion which starred Priyanka Chopra, Kangana Ranaut, Mugdha Godse and Arjan Bajwa. She was a contestant in Fear Factor: Khatron Ke Khiladi (season 4) hosted by Akshay Kumar. She featured in an item song from the movie Karu Toh Karu Kya and she featured in the music videos "Meri beri ke ber" and "Ek aankh maro".

References

External links
 

Living people
Female models from Moscow
Russian female models
Russian people of Indian descent
Russian expatriates in India
Female models from Mumbai
Mithibai College alumni
Year of birth missing (living people)
Fear Factor: Khatron Ke Khiladi participants